In Greek mythology, Pandora (Ancient Greek: Πανδώρα, derived from πᾶν, pān, i.e. "all" and δῶρον, dōron, i.e. "gift", thus "the all-endowed", "all-gifted" or "all-giving") was the name of the following women:

 Pandora, first human woman created by the gods.
 Pandora, daughter of King Deucalion and Pyrrha and granddaughter of the above figure.
 Pandora, an Athenian princess as the second eldest daughter of King Erechtheus of Athens and probably Praxithea, daughter of Phrasimus and Diogeneia. Together with her sister Protogeneia, they sacrificed herself on behalf of their country when an army came from Boeotia during the war between Athens and Eleusis. Pandora's other sisters were Procris, Creusa, Oreithyia, Chthonia, and Merope while her possible brothers were Cecrops, Pandorus, Metion, Orneus, Thespius, Eupalamus and Sicyon.

Notes

References 

 Hesiod, Catalogue of Women from Homeric Hymns, Epic Cycle, Homerica translated by Evelyn-White, H G. Loeb Classical Library Volume 57. London: William Heinemann, 1914. Online version at theio.com
Diodorus Siculus, The Library of History translated by Charles Henry Oldfather. Twelve volumes. Loeb Classical Library. Cambridge, Massachusetts: Harvard University Press; London: William Heinemann, Ltd. 1989. Vol. 3. Books 4.59–8. Online version at Bill Thayer's Web Site
Diodorus Siculus, Bibliotheca Historica. Vol 1-2. Immanel Bekker. Ludwig Dindorf. Friedrich Vogel. in aedibus B. G. Teubneri. Leipzig. 1888-1890. Greek text available at the Perseus Digital Library.
Lucius Mestrius Plutarchus, Lives with an English Translation by Bernadotte Perrin. Cambridge, MA. Harvard University Press. London. William Heinemann Ltd. 1914. 1. Online version at the Perseus Digital Library. Greek text available from the same website.
Pausanias, Description of Greece with an English Translation by W.H.S. Jones, Litt.D., and H.A. Ormerod, M.A., in 4 Volumes. Cambridge, MA, Harvard University Press; London, William Heinemann Ltd. 1918. . Online version at the Perseus Digital Library
Pausanias, Graeciae Descriptio. 3 vols. Leipzig, Teubner. 1903.  Greek text available at the Perseus Digital Library.
Stephanus of Byzantium, Stephani Byzantii Ethnicorum quae supersunt, edited by August Meineike (1790-1870), published 1849. A few entries from this important ancient handbook of place names have been translated by Brady Kiesling. Online version at the Topos Text Project.
 Suida, Suda Encyclopedia translated by Ross Scaife, David Whitehead, William Hutton, Catharine Roth, Jennifer Benedict, Gregory Hays, Malcolm Heath Sean M. Redmond, Nicholas Fincher, Patrick Rourke, Elizabeth Vandiver, Raphael Finkel, Frederick Williams, Carl Widstrand, Robert Dyer, Joseph L. Rife, Oliver Phillips and many others. Online version at the Topos Text Project.

Princesses in Greek mythology
Attican characters in Greek mythology
Suicides in Greek mythology